Sahna is a village and union council of Mandi Bahauddin District in the Punjab province of Pakistan. It is located at 32°32'60N 73°20'60E and has an altitude of 211 metres (695 feet).

References

Union councils of Mandi Bahauddin District
Villages in Mandi Bahauddin District